Bolderājas dzelzceļš (English: The Railroad of/to Bolderāja) is the full-length debut album by Latvian band Dzeltenie Pastnieki, following the demo recording Madonas galerts. It was released by means of magnitizdat in 1981, and 'officially' in 2003. The title of the album is commonly misspelt as Bolderājas dzelzsceļš – including on the officially released CD, cassette and LP.

Track listing
"Zaļais garais vilciens" (Ingus Baušķenieks/Juris Boiko) 7:28
"Sliktā dziesma par zaķu salu" (Hardijs Lediņš/Boiko) 3:53
"Čemodāns" (Baušķenieks/Lediņš) 5:47
"Lai tu aizmirstu" (Baušķenieks) 4:47
"Lokomotīve jūras krastā" (Lediņš) 2:41
"Nāc ārā no ūdens" (Lediņš) 5:27
"Avū avū baltas kājas" (trad., arr. Dzeltenie Pastnieki) 2:17
"Trijos naktī" (Baušķenieks) 3:36
"Mana kafejnīca ir salauzta" (Lediņš/Boiko) 4:02
"Dzeltenais viltus pastnieks" (Viesturs Slava/Mārtiņš Rutkis/Lediņš) 4:38

Credits
Cover photography - Gvido Kajons
Inlay photography - Vilnis Vītoliņš, Mārcis Bendiks

Release history

References

External links 
 Bolderājas dzelzceļš at Discogs

1981 debut albums
Dzeltenie Pastnieki albums